Operation Brotherhood was recipient of the Ramon Magsaysay Award in 1958 in acknowledgement of the spirit of service to other peoples in a time of need, with which it was conceived and has been carried forward, as well as the international amity it has fostered in Vietnam.

References

Charities based in the Philippines
Non-profit organizations based in the Philippines